Kenyentulus serdinensis is a species of proturan in the family Acerentomidae. It is found in Southern Asia.

References

Further reading

 

Protura
Articles created by Qbugbot
Animals described in 1998